Bridgnorth Castle is a castle in the town of Bridgnorth, Shropshire. It is a scheduled monument, first listed in 1928.

History

12th century
The castle was founded in 1101 by Robert de Belleme, the son of the French Earl, Roger de Montgomery, who succeeded his father as Earl of Shrewsbury, possibly on the site of a Saxon burh built by Æthelflæd in 912. One year later in 1102, King Henry I took control of the castle from Robert de Belleme and Henry built another temporary castle on Panpudding Hill. Much of the outer building, which consists of shattered walls, dates to a period of construction that is believed to have occurred between 1105-1113. Around 1120, Henry I re-plastered the walls of the castle and replaced them with better quality stone. Its principal feature, a square great tower, was built during the reign of Henry II in 1160 and the castle was extended between 1166-1174. In the early 1200s construction to extend the castle continued.

13th-16th centuries
A turret or mural tower, present in 1160, was extended in 1226 and the barbican, with a drawbridge, was built in 1212 and was first mentioned in 1221. In 1242, the outer bailey, which does not survive today, was legally made part of the town and in 1261, the sheriff of Bridgnorth was ordered to roof and repair the houses within the bailey of the castle. By 1267, the castle had begun to lose its significance and it was in disrepair by 1281.

In 1321, the barons who rebelled against King Edward II of England during the Despenser War took control of the castle but by the mid 14th century, the castle had lost most of its strategic importance again due to the Black Death and it was largely forgotten about by the 15th century.

It was noted as being in disrepair during the start of Henry VIII's reign (1509-1547) and it was partially repaired around 1530. John Leland visited Bridgnorth Castle sometime between 1536 and 1542 and his description of Bridgnorth Castle is as following:

17th-21st centuries
In 1642, King Charles I described Bridgnorth and its castle as "the finest in my domain". During the Civil War, Bridgnorth was one of the Midlands' main Royalist strongholds and in 1642 many Royalist troops were garrisoned there. 

The castle was partly slighted in 1645 and in 1646, Cromwell’s Roundheads arrived with orders to take Bridgnorth for the Parliamentarians from the garrison led by Sir Robert Howard. Following a three-week siege starting on March 31, 1646, Cromwell was successful and he ordered that the castle be demolished, but before this, they tried a strategy that failed. Lavington's Hole became one of many other holes within Castle Hill now known as the Hermitage Caves, many of which were supposedly dug during the 10th century by the Anglo-Saxon historian Æthelweard, and the tunnels are now no longer accessible to the public due to safety concerns.

By 1647 little of the structure remained. The Parliamentarians left it much as it is today, the stone from the castle being taken and used to repair the town's damaged buildings starting from 1647. The royal palace, known as the "King's House" was still maintained as a royal residence until later in the 17th century, after the Civil war ended.

In 1821, The Hole in The Wall, a public house built against ruins of the castle, was demolished and the postern (northern) bailey gate belonging to the castle was discovered. It was planned to be kept standing but later that year, the bailey gate was demolished by being blown up with gunpowder as it heavily obstructed traffic.

Parts of the great tower still remain, but because of the damage caused during the Civil War, it now leans at an angle of 15 degrees, four times the lean of the leaning tower of Pisa. By 1900, the castle was overgrown by moss and it was beginning to go into another state of disrepair, but in 1956, the castle was donated to the town council and the overgrowing shrubbery and moss were cleaned off the ruins. In 1945, the ruined barbican was discovered and in 2001, the castle grounds were excavated over three days by archaeological television programme Time Team, clarifying the layout of the castle and the history of its construction.

See also
Castles in Great Britain and Ireland
List of castles in England

References

Castles in Shropshire
Ruins in Shropshire
Bridgnorth
Ruined castles in England